The Urban Redevelopment Authority of Pittsburgh (URA) is the City of Pittsburgh’s economic development agency, committed to creating jobs, expanding the City’s tax base, and improving the vitality of businesses and neighborhoods. The URA achieves this mission by assembling, preparing, and conveying sites for major mixed-use developments; and by providing a portfolio of programs that include financing for business location, relocation and expansion, housing construction and rehabilitation, and home purchases and improvements.

Public Projects
The URA is currently facilitating a number of large-scale real estate developments, including:

 Hazelwood Green
 Bakery Square 2.0
 Civic Arena Redevelopment
 East Liberty Transit Center
 Hunt Armory
 The Gardens at Market Square
 SouthSide Works

 Station Square

Impact

As of 2015, nearly $3 billion in private investment has been leveraged by $336 million in tax increment financing administered by the URA – a leverage ratio of 9 to 1.

Between 2006 and 2012, the URA:
 Issued 401 loans/grants totaling $580 million with $80 million of URA investment
 Invested $348 million in economic development projects, leveraging over a billion dollars in total project costs
 Leveraged $60 million in tax increment financing (TIF) to create $520 million in total investment
 Initiated $545 million in housing development projects, creating 4,024 housing units with $138 million of URA investment
 Provided $9.4 million in loans and grants to rehabilitate 611 housing units and $20.3 million in mortgage loans for the purchase of 422 housing units

References

Government of Pittsburgh
Municipal authorities in Pennsylvania
Urban development authorities